The 1970 LSU Tigers football team represented Louisiana State University during the 1970 NCAA University Division football season.

Following a 3–0 loss to No. 2 Notre Dame at South Bend, LSU was extended a bid to face Big Eight Conference champion Nebraska in the Orange Bowl. However, the bid was contingent on the Tigers defeating both Tulane at New Orleans and Ole Miss at Baton Rouge in the final two weeks of the season.

Still steaming about being shut out of the major bowl games in 1969 despite a 9–1 record, LSU responded to the challenge. The Tigers overcame a stubborn Tulane squad, which went on to defeat Colorado in the Liberty Bowl, and then dismantled Ole Miss 61–17 in front of a large television audience and nearly 70,000 fans in Tiger Stadium. In that game, Tommy Casanova tied an NCAA record with two punt return touchdowns in a single game, Craig Burns returned a third put for a touchdown, and Ronnie Estay sacked Rebel quarterback Archie Manning for a safety.

In the Orange Bowl, LSU led Nebraska 12-10 after three quarters, but a late touchdown by Jerry Tagge lifted the Cornhuskers to a 17–12 victory and the Associated Press national championship.

Casanova and linebacker Mike Anderson were recognized as consensus All-Americans.

Schedule

Roster

Team players drafted into the NFL

References

LSU
LSU Tigers football seasons
Southeastern Conference football champion seasons
LSU Tigers football